Diary of an Awesome Friendly Kid: Rowley Jefferson's Journal is a spin-off of the Diary of a Wimpy Kid series by Jeff Kinney. Unlike the main-series books, which are written from the perspective of Greg Heffley, Diary of an Awesome Friendly Kid is written from the perspective of Greg's best friend, Rowley Jefferson, acting as Greg's biographer. The book was released on April 9, 2019. A sequel, titled Rowley Jefferson's Awesome Friendly Adventure was released on August 4, 2020, delayed from an initial release date of April 7, 2020.

Plot
Rowley is 12 years and a half old in his diary. Rowley starts his diary by describing his family and then explaining that he started writing in one because his best friend, Greg Heffley, owns one as well. In the second entry, Rowley shows his diary to Greg, who accuses Rowley of copying him. Greg then comes up with the idea that Rowley's journal should be Greg's biography, since he plans to be rich and famous. Rowley complies, and changes the main character to Greg and the title of his diary from Diary of an Awesome Friendly Kid to Diary of Greg Heffley by Greg Heffley's Best Friend Rowley Jefferson.

Rowley starts the biography with a chapter titled "Early Life," and skips ahead to when he first met Greg in fourth grade. He writes that he likes Greg for "doing hilarious things and playing wacky pranks," then provides minor details about Greg's family. Rowley then changes topics to his first sleepover with Greg, where he pees his pants after they got scared by a noise outside, which turns out to be Greg's brother Rodrick. Other entries focus on when Rowley saves Greg from a birthday party after falling in a ditch with a hornet's nest at the bottom, Greg's "accomplishments" (a blank list for Rowley to fill in later when Greg accomplishes something), Rowley and Greg playing in the woods when Rowley trips over a rock and Greg tells him they disturbed an "ancient burial ground," Rowley believing that his deceased grandfather has come back as a ghost to haunt his old cabin, Greg playing a "wacky prank" by pretending to be a burglar, and Rowley mishearing Greg's request to "pull him back up on his feet" after he loses his balance, instead grabbing Greg by the feet and causing him to fall in a puddle, resulting in Greg chasing Rowley with a stick until dinnertime.

In Rowley's entry about "the time when Greg created a special award just for me," Greg gives Rowley a "Good Boy Award" for cleaning Greg's garage. Greg gives Rowley more awards for doing his chores, including ones worth more than a regular award. Rowley eventually says that they aren't special anymore because he has so many, so Greg makes a "point system" called "Li'l Goodies", with Rowley receiving a "Fantastic Prize" for getting 50 points, which turns out to be a basket of dirty laundry (Greg claimed it was a test).

Rowley then writes about "The time I found out Greg is a lousy study partner." While studying for an extra hard math test with Rowley at the library, Greg tries to goof off to avoid studying and makes a secret code to try to cheat on the test. Opposed to the idea of cheating, Rowley suggests that they study separately, and they move to desks with dividers. Greg starts to slip notes with questions for the chapter between the dividers, and then starts slipping mean notes. This leads to Greg and Rowley making entire pages of rude drawings with "that's you" notes, and then Greg ties another adult's shoes together, causing him to fall, and they move to the children's section, where Greg started throwing paper balls in a trash can, while mocking Rowley to attempt a basket. After he makes a blind shot first try, Greg tries to do the same, at which point Rowley realizes Greg is using his notes to do it, resulting in him getting mad at Greg, and they get kicked out of the library after Rowley chases Greg trying to throw an egg Greg pretended to lay.

In the next entry, "The time I made the worst mistake of my life" (essentially part two of the previous entry), Greg cheats by copying Rowley's test. Their teacher, Ms. Beck, catches them as Greg had copied everything about Rowley's test, including his name. They both get in trouble, and while Greg is given 3 days of detention and is assigned to do the test again, Rowley is given a warning. He gets upset after he is warned not to cheat. Rowley writes about "The time Greg totally had my back" next, hoping that Greg won't get mad for making him look bad. The class gets a substitute teacher, who is not bothered by the students acting crazy and not doing any work. Their normal teacher announces that she won't be returning, so the sub remained for the whole year. Everyone, including Rowley, gets a "C" grade, obviously showing that the teacher didn't look at any assignments. Greg complains that Rowley was the only one who did classwork and that the teacher was horrible and should be reported to the principal, causing the teacher to increase Rowley's grade to a "B."

Rowley then tells us about things that Greg said that might not be true, but are very clearly not true. Rowley then brings up an anecdote in which he and Greg draw their own superhero. They first find old "Zoo-Wee Mama" comics in a sketchbook, then Greg gets the idea to create a superhero, sell the movie rights, and gain money. After imagining what they would do with the money, they come up with several inadequate concepts. Greg eventually decides that he and Rowley should each come up with their own idea, with Greg making fun of Rowley's superhero: "Amazing Guy", but recants his actions in order to get some money if Rowley sells the movie rights. Due to creative differences, they split again and have their two superheroes fight each other.

In the penultimate diary entry, Rowley has a two-night sleepover at Greg's house, where they first prank-call Scotty Douglas, then sneak out to bounce on a trampoline the first night. Greg's parents get mad at these actions, and send Greg to Manny's room when they start fighting. The next day, Greg isn't happy about Rowley getting special attention due to being a guest, so Greg's mom decides they need time apart as friends get on each others nerves, and Rowley goes to play with Manny. After Greg played a trick on Rowley to steal a cookie from him, Greg's mom has Rowley take home one of Greg's toys so they would be even. After Rowley picks a broken knight action figure, Greg tries to get it back through a variety of tricks, until they start fighting again. Greg's mom then divides his and Rowley's room in half. Greg then activates an "invisible forcefield" that "zaps" Rowley if he tries to pass through it. Greg then prevents Rowley from using the bathroom, forcing him to pee out the window in the morning. The sleepover ends with Greg flushing Rowley's knight figure down the toilet, prompting his mom to let Rowley take three of Greg's toys with him, and this time he picked good ones.

Rowley shows Greg his biography, and Greg is mad that it focuses on both him and Rowley instead of just him. Rowley suggests that it could be their biography, but Greg threatens to change all the parts with Rowley to make him dumber and change his name. He then closes the book on Rowley's face, calling it payback for dropping him in the puddle, and Rowley then hits Greg in the face with the book, causing him to fall into another puddle. Rowley then plans on making the book about the spooky items they did, though notes that Greg also wet his pants at their first sleepover when Rodrick scared them. Rowley changes to the diary's focus back to himself. The book ends with Rowley's parents telling him he should find new friends, and Rowley responding that he can't because Greg takes up a lot of his time, but since Greg's mother says that friends get on each other's nerves, he and Greg must be "best friends" since they get on each other's nerves the most.

Development
A shorter Wimpy Kid story from Rowley's point of view was written to celebrate World Book Day 2019. Kinney later developed it into a full-length book, becoming Rowley Jefferson's Journal, because he enjoyed writing it.

In an interview on the official Wimpy Kid YouTube channel, Kinney described that he noticed "the audience [...] always rooting for Rowley" in the Diary of a Wimpy Kid movies. This inspired him to write a novel from Rowley's point of view. On the subject of the book's illustrations, Kinney said that he liked how his art style is still recognizable even though Rowley "draws like a five year-old." He stated that he enjoyed writing the book and that it is his favorite book in the series, because he likes how Rowley is unable to keep the book's focus on Greg. When asked if the series would change to focus entirely on Rowley, Kinney confirmed that he will continue to write main-series books, but that he would also "really like to write more Rowley books," because "it's a lot of fun, and I think it's really fresh, and [Rowley] can write in lots of different styles about lots of different genres. So I'd really like to get to there, where Rowley is authoring lots of books." The following year, a follow-up to Rowley Jefferson's Journal, titled Rowley Jefferson's Awesome Friendly Adventure, was published. Rowley Jefferson's Awesome Friendly Spooky Stories, another sequel, was released in March 2021.

See also
 List of spin-offs

References

Diary of a Wimpy Kid
Novels by Jeff Kinney
American young adult novels
2019 American novels
Amulet Books books
2019 children's books